Acytolepis najara is a butterfly of the family Lycaenidae. It is endemic to Sulawesi.

References

Acytolepis
Butterflies described in 1910